The Chebistuane River is a tributary of the Barlow River (Chibougamau River), flowing into the Regional County Municipality (RCM) of Eeyou Istchee Baie-James, in Jamésie, in the administrative region of Nord-du-Québec, in the province of Quebec, in Canada.

The course of the river successively crosses the townships of Richardson and Blaiklock. This river is also located in the Lakes Albanel, Mistassini and Waconichi Wildlife Sanctuary.

The hydrographic slope of the Chébistuane River is accessible by a forest road from Chibougamau, going up north and cutting the river.

The surface of the Chébistuane River is usually frozen from early November to mid-May, however, safe ice circulation is generally from mid-November to mid-April.

Geography

Toponymy 
The place name "Chébistuane River" was made official on December 5, 1968, at the Commission de toponymie du Québec, i.e. at the creation of this commission

References

See also 

Rivers of Nord-du-Québec
Nottaway River drainage basin
Eeyou Istchee James Bay